The Office of the Presidential Adviser on Peace, Reconciliation and Unity (OPAPRU), formerly Office of the Presidential Adviser on the Peace Process (OPAPP) is a government agency which handles peace talks and negotiations related to internal conflict and rebellion in the Philippines most notably the CPP-NPA-NDF and Moro conflicts.

History
In the 1960s to 1970s the Moro National Liberation Front which called for the self-determination of the Moro people led by Nur Misuari as well as the New People's Army which aimed for the establishment of a communist government to govern the country was established. The administration of President Ferdinand Marcos started negotiations with the MNLF which led to the signing of the Tripoli Agreement in 1976. This led to a plebiscite where people voted whether to approve or disapprove the establishment of an autonomous region in the southern Philippines. The voters as well as the MNLF itself which claimed the implementation of the deal as one-sided in favor of the government rejected the plebiscite. No negotiations was made with the NPA under Marcos and the Moro Islamic Liberation Front (MILF) broke away from the MNLF.

When Corazon Aquino assumed presidency following the People Power Revolution, she started peace talks with the MNLF, MILF, the CPP–NPA–NDF, and the Cordillera People's Liberation Army (CPLA). Peace talks with CPLA led to a bodong or peace pact that led to the establishment of the Cordillera Administrative Region. The Jeddah Accord was signed with the MNLF with the government agreeing to pursue further talks on the establishment of an autonomous region consisting of Mindanao and Palawan but peace talks collapsed in 1987 due to conflict between the Jeddah and Tripoli accords. Negotiations with the CPP–NPA–NDF is likewise unsuccessful.

Aquino's successor, President Fidel V. Ramos upon being elected in 1994 started negotiations with the NDF in the Netherlands and issued  Proclamation No. 10 which granted amnesty to communist rebels, this was amended through Proclamation No. 10-A which established the National Unification Commission (NUC) which made a report regarding the "formulation of a peace process" by conducting public consultations in different parts of the country to gain input. The NUC submitted its report to President Ramos on July 31, 1993, and became defunct the beginning of the next month.

The Office of the Presidential Adviser on the Peace Process was established on September 15, 1993, through the issuance of Executive Order No. 125 by President Ramos. Ramos took into account recommendations of the NUC.

The agency was renamed to Office of the Presidential Adviser on Peace, Reconciliation and Unity (OPAPRU) on December 29, 2021.

See also 
 Moro Islamic Liberation Front
 Communist Party of the Philippines
 Moro National Liberation Front
 Cordillera People's Liberation Army
 Revolutionary Workers' Party (Philippines)
 Manuel Yan
 Teresita Quintos Deles
 Marvic Leonen

References

1993 establishments in the Philippines
Communism in the Philippines
Moro conflict
Government agencies under the Office of the President of the Philippines
Peace processes
Establishments by Philippine executive order